is a passenger railway station located in the city of Kawaguchi, Saitama, Japan, operated by East Japan Railway Company (JR East).

Lines

Station layout
The station has one island platform, serving two tracks, with an elevated station building.  It has a Midori no Madoguchi staffed ticket office and also a View Plaza travel agency.

Platforms

History

The station opened on 10 September 1910.

Passenger statistics
In fiscal 2019, the station was used by an average of 84,197 passengers daily (boarding passengers only). The daily average passenger figures (boarding passengers only) in previous years are as shown below.

Surrounding area

East side
 Kawaguchi City Office
 Kawaguchi Shrine
 Kawaguchi Municipal Medical Center
 Kawaguchi Motogō Station (Saitama Rapid Railway Line)
 
 
 Ario Kawaguchi shopping centre
 Atlia municipal art gallery

West side
 Kawaguchi Nishi Park
 Saiseikai Kawaguchi General Hospital

See also
List of railway stations in Japan

References

External links

JR East Kawaguchi Station 

Railway stations in Saitama Prefecture
Keihin-Tōhoku Line
Stations of East Japan Railway Company
Railway stations in Kawaguchi, Saitama
Railway stations in Japan opened in 1910